First Fruits and Tenths was a form of tax on clergy taking up a benefice or ecclesiastical position in Great Britain.  The Court of First Fruits and Tenths was established in 1540 to collect from clerical benefices certain moneys that had previously been sent to Rome.

Clergy had to pay a portion of their first year's income (known as annates) and a tenth of their revenue annually thereafter. Originally, the money was paid to the papacy, but Henry VIII's 1534 statute diverted the money to the English Crown as part of his campaign to pressure the Pope into granting him an annulment of his marriage with Catherine of Aragon.

The 1534 Act of Conditional Restraint of Annates allowed taxes on first fruits and tenths (of benefice’s income) to be transferred from the Pope to the King. Thomas Cromwell set up a special financial administration for these revenues.  Following his removal from office, a separate administration was established: the Court of First Fruits and Tenths. In 1554 the Court was dissolved, and responsibility for administration of these revenues passed to the Office of First Fruits and Tenths, a department of the Exchequer. During the 18th century, these payments formed the basis of Queen Anne's Bounty.

Substance and procedure
First-fruits (annates) and tenths (decimae) originally formed part of the revenue paid by the clergy to the papal exchequer. The former consist of the first whole year's profit of all spiritual preferments, the latter of one-tenth of their annual profits after the first year.

The proceedings of the court relate to a variety of aspects of the collection of these dues for the Crown and include, for example, accountings, sheriffs' returns to writs concerning livings and their incumbents and appearances and hearings in cases of first fruits.

The income derived from first-fruits and tenths was annexed to the revenue of the crown in 1534 (26 Hen. VIII. c. 3), and so continued until 1703. The Court of First Fruits and Tenths was subsequently subsumed into the Exchequer Office of First Fruits and Tenths in 1554.

Beginning in 1703, Queen Anne's Bounty was the name applied to a perpetual fund of first-fruits and tenths granted by a charter of Queen Anne and confirmed by statute in 1703 (2 & 3 Anne, c. 11), for the augmentation of the livings of the poorer Anglican clergy.  In accordance with the provisions of two acts of 1703 (5 & 6 Anne, c. 24, and 6 Anne, c. 27), about 3900 poor livings under the annual value of £50 were discharged from first-fruits and tenths.

References

Dissolution of the Monasteries
Former courts and tribunals in England and Wales
1540 establishments in England
Courts and tribunals established in 1540
Courts and tribunals disestablished in 1554
1554 disestablishments in England